In multilinear algebra, the tensor rank decomposition  or the  decomposition of a tensor is the decomposition of a tensor in terms of a sum of minimum   tensors.   This is an open problem.

Canonical polyadic decomposition (CPD) is a variant of the rank decomposition which computes the best fitting   terms for a user specified .  The CP decomposition has found some applications in linguistics and chemometrics. The CP rank was introduced by Frank Lauren Hitchcock in 1927 and later rediscovered several times, notably in psychometrics. 
The CP decomposition is referred to as CANDECOMP, PARAFAC, or CANDECOMP/PARAFAC (CP). PARAFAC2 rank  decomposition is yet to explore. 

Another popular generalization of the matrix SVD known as the higher-order singular value decomposition computes orthonormal mode matrices and has found applications in econometrics, signal processing, computer vision, computer graphics, psychometrics.

Notation 
A scalar variable is denoted by lower case italic letters,  and an upper bound scalar is denoted by an upper case italic letter, .

Indices are denoted by a combination of lowercase and upper case italic letters, . Multiple indices that one might encounter when referring to the multiple modes of a tensor are conveniently denoted by  where  .

A vector is denoted by a lower case bold Times Roman,  and a matrix is denoted by bold upper case letters .

A higher order tensor is denoted by calligraphic letters,.

Definition 

A data tensor   is a collection of multivariate observations organized into a -way array where =+1. Every tensor may be represented with a suitably large  as a linear combination of  rank-1 tensors:

 

where  and  where . When the number of terms  is minimal in the above expression, then  is called the rank of the tensor, and the decomposition is often referred to as a (tensor) rank decomposition, minimal CP decomposition, or Canonical Polyadic Decomposition (CPD). If the number of terms is not minimal, then the above decomposition is often referred to as CANDECOMP/PARAFAC, Polyadic decomposition'.

 Tensor rank 

Contrary to the case of matrices, computing the rank of a tensor is NP-hard. A simple polynomial-time algorithm exists for certifying that a tensor is of rank 1, namely the higher-order singular value decomposition.

The rank of the tensor of zeros is zero by convention. The rank of a tensor  is one, provided that .

 Field dependence 
The rank of a tensor depends on the field over which the tensor is decomposed. It is known that some real tensors may admit a complex decomposition whose rank is strictly less than the rank of a real decomposition of the same tensor. As an example, consider the following real tensor

 

where . The rank of this tensor over the reals is known to be 3, while its complex rank is only 2 because it is the sum of a complex rank-1 tensor with its complex conjugate, namely

 

where .

In contrast, the rank of real matrices will never decrease under a field extension to : real matrix rank and complex matrix rank coincide for real matrices.

 Generic rank 
The generic rank  is defined as the least rank  such that the closure in the Zariski topology of the set of tensors of rank at most  is the entire space . In the case of real tensors, the set of tensors of rank at most  only forms an open set of positive measure in the Euclidean topology. There may exist Euclidean-open sets of tensors of rank strictly higher than the generic rank. All ranks appearing on open sets in the Euclidean topology are called typical ranks. The smallest typical rank is called the generic rank; this definition applies to both complex and real tensors. The generic rank of tensor spaces was initially studied in 1983 by Volker Strassen.

Practically, this means that a randomly sampled real tensor (from a continuous probability measure on the space of tensors) of size  will be a rank-1 tensor with probability zero, a rank-2 tensor with positive probability, and rank-3 with positive probability. On the other hand, a randomly sampled complex tensor of the same size will be a rank-1 tensor with probability zero, a rank-2 tensor with probability one, and a rank-3 tensor with probability zero. It is even known that the generic rank-3 real tensor in  will be of complex rank equal to 2.

The generic rank of tensor spaces depends on the distinction between balanced and unbalanced tensor spaces. A tensor space , where ,
is called unbalanced whenever

 

and it is called balanced otherwise.

 Unbalanced tensor spaces 
When the first factor is very large with respect to the other factors in the tensor product, then the tensor space essentially behaves as a matrix space. The generic rank of tensors living in an unbalanced tensor spaces is known to equal

 

almost everywhere. More precisely, the rank of every tensor in an unbalanced tensor space , where  is some indeterminate closed set in the Zariski topology, equals the above value.

 Balanced tensor spaces 
The expected generic rank of tensors living in a balanced tensor space is equal to

 

almost everywhere for complex tensors and on a Euclidean-open set for real tensors, where

 

For real tensors,  is the least rank that is expected to occur on a set of positive Euclidean measure. The value  is often referred to as the expected generic rank of the tensor space  because it is only conjecturally correct. It is known that the true generic rank always satisfies

 

The Abo–Ottaviani–Peterson conjecture states that equality is expected, i.e., with the following exceptional cases:

 
 

In each of these exceptional cases, the generic rank is known to be .

The AOP conjecture has been proved completely in a number of special cases. Lickteig showed already in 1985 that , provided that . In 2011, a major breakthrough was established by Catalisano, Geramita, and Gimigliano who proved that the expected dimension of the set of rank  tensors of format  is the expected one except for rank 3 tensors in the 4 factor case, yet the expected rank in that case is still 4. As a consequence,   for all binary tensors.

 Maximum rank 

The maximum rank that can be admitted by any of the tensors in a tensor space is unknown in general; even a conjecture about this maximum rank is missing.

 

It is well-known that the foregoing inequality may be strict.

 Border rank 

For order-2 tensors, i.e., matrices, rank and border rank always coincide, however, for tensors of order  they may differ. Border tensors were first studied in the context of fast approximate matrix multiplication algorithms by Bini, Lotti, and Romani in 1980.

A classic example of a border tensor is the rank-3 tensor

 

It can be approximated arbitrarily well by the following sequence of rank-2 tensors

 

Therefore, its border rank is 2, which is strictly less than its rank. When the two vectors are orthogonal, this example is also known as a W state.

 Properties 

 Identifiability 
For this reason, the parameters  of a rank-1 tensor  are called identifiable or essentially unique. A rank- tensor  is called identifiable if every of its tensor rank decompositions is the sum of the same set of  distinct tensors  where the 's are of rank 1. An identifiable rank- thus has only one essentially unique decomposition and all  tensor rank decompositions of  can be obtained by permuting the order of the summands. Observe that in a tensor rank decomposition all the 's are distinct, for otherwise the rank of  would be at most .

 Generic identifiability 
It can be shown that for every , where  is a closed set in the Zariski topology, the decomposition on the right-hand side is a sum of a different set of rank-1 tensors than the decomposition on the left-hand side, entailing that order-2 tensors of rank  are generically not identifiable.

For simplicity in notation, assume without loss of generality that the factors are ordered such that . Then, the following statement was proved to be correct using a computer-assisted proof for all spaces of dimension , and it is conjectured to be valid in general:

There exists a closed set  in the Zariski topology such that every tensor is identifiable ( is called generically identifiable in this case), unless either one of the following exceptional cases holds: 
 The rank is too large: ; 
 The space is identifiability-unbalanced, i.e., and the rank is too large: ; 
In these exceptional cases, the generic (and also minimum) number of complex decompositions is 
 proved to be  in the first 4 cases; 
 proved to be two in case 5;
 expected to be six in case 6; 
 proved to be two in case 7; and
In summary, the generic tensor of order  and rank  that is not identifiability-unbalanced is expected to be identifiable (modulo the exceptional cases in small spaces).

 Ill-posedness of the standard approximation problem 
The rank approximation problem asks for the rank- decomposition closest (in the usual Euclidean topology) to some rank- tensor , where . That is, one seeks to solve

 

where  is the Frobenius norm.

It was shown in a 2008 paper by de Silva and Lim that the above standard approximation problem may be ill-posed. A solution to aforementioned problem may sometimes not exist because the set over which one optimizes is not closed. As such, a minimizer may not exist, even though an infimum would exist. The rank-3 tensor

 

can be approximated arbitrarily well by the following sequence of rank-2 tensors

 

This example neatly illustrates the general principle that a sequence of rank- tensors that converges to a tensor of strictly higher rank needs to admit at least two individual rank-1 terms whose norms become unbounded. Stated formally, whenever a sequence

 

 

This phenomenon is often encountered when attempting to approximate a tensor using numerical optimization algorithms. It is sometimes called the problem of diverging components''. It was, in addition, shown that a random low-rank tensor over the reals may not admit a rank-2 approximation with positive probability, leading to the understanding that the ill-posedness problem is an important consideration when employing the tensor rank decomposition.

A common partial solution to the ill-posedness problem consists of imposing an additional inequality constraint that bounds the norm of the individual rank-1 terms by some constant. Other constraints that result in a closed set, and, thus, well-posed optimization problem, include imposing positivity or a bounded inner product strictly less than unity between the rank-1 terms appearing in the sought decomposition.

Calculating the CPD 

Alternating algorithms:
 alternating least squares (ALS)
 alternating slice-wise diagonalisation (ASD)

Direct algorithms:
 pencil-based algorithms
moment-based algorithms

General optimization algorithms:
 simultaneous diagonalization (SD)
 simultaneous generalized Schur decomposition (SGSD)
 Levenberg–Marquardt (LM)
 nonlinear conjugate gradient (NCG)
 limited memory BFGS (L-BFGS)

General polynomial system solving algorithms:

 homotopy continuation

Applications 
In machine learning, the CP-decomposition is the central ingredient in learning probabilistic latent variables models via the technique of moment-matching. For example, consider the multi-view model which is a probabilistic latent variable model. In this model, the generation of samples are posited as follows: there exists a hidden random variable that is not observed directly, given which, there are several conditionally independent random variables known as the different "views" of the hidden variable. For simplicity, assume there are three symmetrical views  of a -state categorical hidden variable . Then the empirical third moment of this latent variable model can be written as:
.

In applications such as topic modeling, this can be interpreted as the co-occurrence of words in a document. Then the eigenvalues of this empirical moment tensor can be interpreted as the probability of choosing a specific topic and each column of the factor matrix  corresponds to probabilities of words in the vocabulary in the corresponding topic.

See also 
 Latent class analysis
 Multilinear subspace learning
 Singular value decomposition
 Tucker decomposition
 Higher-order singular value decomposition
 Tensor decomposition

References

Further reading

External links
PARAFAC Tutorial
Parallel Factor Analysis (PARAFAC)
FactoMineR (free exploratory multivariate data analysis software linked to R)

Multilinear algebra